The term Franco-Austrian War primarily refers to the Second Italian War of Independence.

Franco-Austrian War may also refer to any of a number of wars between France and Austria:

 Part of the Thirty Years' War (1635–1648)
 The Franco-Dutch War (1672–1678)
 The War of the Grand Alliance (1688–1697)
 The War of the Spanish Succession (1701–1714)
 The War of the Polish Succession (1733–1735)
 The War of the Austrian Succession (1741–1748)
 The French Revolutionary Wars:
 War of the First Coalition (1792–1797) 
 War of the Second Coalition (1798–1801) 
 Parts of the Napoleonic Wars: 
 War of the Third Coalition (1805)
 War of the Fifth Coalition (1809)
 War of the Sixth Coalition (1813–1814)
 The Second Italian War of Independence (1859)
 World War I (1914–1918)